= Planetmaster =

1984 video game

- Developer: Magnetic Harvest
- Publisher: Magnetic Harvest
- Release: 1984

Planetmaster is a 1984 video game published by Magnetic Harvest.

== Gameplay ==
Planetmaster is a game in which conservation for survival is part of the simulation, as the player must transport six endangered alien species to the Space Sanctuary Satellite.

== Reception ==
Johnny Wilson reviewed the game for Computer Gaming World, and stated that "The simulation not only sensitizes the player to the idea of wildlife preservation and management, but teaches the basic principle of ecological interdependence."
